is a Japanese manga series written by Takahiro and illustrated by Tetsuya Tashiro. It was serialized in Square Enix's Monthly Gangan Joker from March 2010 to December 2016, with its chapters collected in 15 tankōbon volumes. The story focuses on Tatsumi, a young villager who travels to the Capital to raise money for his home only to discover strong corruption in the area. The assassin group known as Night Raid recruits the young man to help them in their fight against the corrupt Empire.

Plot

Tatsumi is a fighter who is accompanied by his two childhood friends, Iyeyasu and Sayo, and sets off into the Capital to search of a way to make money in order to assist his poverty-stricken village. After being separated from his friends in a bandit attack, Tatsumi unsuccessfully attempts to enlist in the army and is swindled out of his money in the Capital. He is taken in by a noble family, but when an assassin group called Night Raid attacks, he learns that his noble hosts actually intended to torture and kill him as they had done to his friends.

As a result, he joins Night Raid, which consists of the swordswoman Akame, the beastly fighter Leone, the self-proclaimed sniper genius Mine, the scissor-wielding Sheele, the string manipulator Lubbock, the armored warrior Bulat, and their leader Najenda, a former general of the imperial army. Night Raid is also part of the revolutionary forces assembled to overthrow the Prime Minister Honest who is manipulating the young emperor for his personal gain despite the rest of the nation falling to poverty and strife.

The members of Night Raid carry , unique weaponry created 900 years ago out of extremely rare materials as well as legendary animals called . The power of the Teigu is so overwhelming that it is said that when two Teigu users fight each other, at least one of them is bound to die.

Although Night Raid successfully assassinate some of Honest's cohorts, they lose Sheele during a fight against capital garrison member Seryu and then Bulat when Honest recruits the Empire's sadist general Esdeath and her Three Beasts. Tatsumi receives Bulat's Teigu, Incursio, as a result while Esdeath replaced her slain subordinates with a group of Teigu-using warriors called the Jaegers. Night Raid, along with new recruits Susanoo (a humanoid Teigu owned by Najenda) and Chelsea, fight the Jaegers with Seryu, Wave, and Akame's younger sister Kurome among its ranks. Over time, the two factions gradually lose some of their members.

When the revolution gains momentum, Honest forms a new secret police force, the Wild Hunt, led by his own son, Syura. But Wild Hunt heavily abuses its authority by killing innocent civilians for their own plans, antagonizing both the Jaegers and Night Raid. Mine was almost killed by Seryu's suicide bomb attack, but she was saved by Tatsumi. After a battle between Wild Hunt and the Jaegers, with casualties from both sides, Esdeath blackmails Honest into dissolving the rest of Wild Hunt. Syura is killed by Lubbock after he captures both him and Tatsumi. Lubbock is killed while attempting to escape, and Tatsumi is sentenced to death despite Esdeath's attempts to save his life. The remaining Night Raid members attack the execution site to rescue Tatsumi while being pursued by the imperial general Budo, who Mine manages to kill at the cost of her Teigu while falling into a coma.

Due to the stress he experienced while escaping the execution site, Tatsumi caused Incursio to transform. It would be revealed that Tatsumi caused the Danger Beast which Incursio was created from, Tyrant, to awaken with the doctor predicting that Tatsumi can use his Teigu a few more times left before it fully fuses onto his body and consumes him. As this occurs, Night Raid confronts the last members of Wild Hunt and finish them off, with Akame taking out big generals on the Empire's side. Akame leaves a message to Wave that she and Kurome intend to settle things as they promised each other. After his attempt to convince Kurome not to get through with it, fighting his way through Tatsumi, Wave manages to stop the sisters' duel and destroys Kurome's Teigu. With this, Wave and Kurome fake their deaths as they run off to start a new life together.

After hearing the news of the remaining Jaegers' deaths, Esdeath resumes her duties as general to hold off the Revolutionary Army when they begin a siege on the capital to remove Honest from power. As a last resort, Honest convinces the emperor himself to join the fight with his family's Teigu. After the remaining Night Raid members assassinated those in the government who have been pulling the strings behind the stage, only Honest and Esdeath are their remaining targets. However, Honest rigged the emperor's Teigu to go berserk.

To confront the emperor's Teigu, Tatsumi uses his last transformation to defeat it with Wave's help while changing into Tyrant. Before being fully consumed, Tatsumi asks Akame to kill him before he loses control and kills everyone. She does so during her battle with Esdeath, later revealed to have only killed the Danger Beast's soul so Tatsumi can live, managing to defeat the general at the cost of her own sword. Esdeath acknowledges her loss and uses her power to commit suicide while regretting that she never got Tatsumi to return her feelings. As the final battle unfolded, Honest attempted to flee before being mortally wounded by Leone after he fatally wounded her and she fused with the remains of her Teigu to give her enough time to capture him so the Revolutionary War can fully end; Afterwards, Leone dies peacefully.

As Honest is later brutally executed with slow dismemberment for his crimes against the people, the Emperor accepts his own public execution while taking responsibility for his inaction as Najenda begins to rebuild their nation into better place. Tatsumi, still trapped in his dragon form, returns to his village with Mine after she recovered and gave birth to their child, who was conceived prior to Mine's coma. Kurome and Wave end up together as well, with the former still scarred by her past while the latter lost one of his internal organs as a price for using two Teigu at once. As for Akame, still working as an assassin to defend the restoring nation from those who would exploit it, she heads eastward to protect her nation and find a means to restore Tatsumi's human form and to find a cure for the pain in her body from Murasame's Trump Card; where the events of Hinowa ga Crush! take place.

Conception
In 2007, Takahiro was asked to do a manga for Square Enix magazine. He originally came up with the idea of an "all-female band of assassins, and the protagonist is a boy who is captured by them and has to work for them". After his editor approved the idea, he waited on serialization until his company had stabilized and had released two other titles, during which he developed the characters, story and world. In August 2009, following the release of Majikoi ~ Oh! Samurai Girls, Takahiro looked for an artist for the serialization, and recruited Tetsuya Tashiro to do the illustrations. He liked Tashiro's ability to draw fast-paced action scenes and that he can draw cute girls. In developing a chapter, Takahiro would write the script first and then have Tashiro determine the panel layout. Takahiro would occasionally get feedback on plot ideas from Tashiro and the editor.

Media

Manga

Written by Takahiro and illustrated by Tetsuya Tashiro, Akame ga Kill! was serialized in Square Enix's shōnen manga magazine Gangan Joker from March 20, 2010, to December 22, 2016. Its chapters were collected in fifteen tankōbon volumes, released from August 21, 2010, to February 22, 2017. On August 25, 2017, it was announced that volume 1.5 of the manga, previously included with anime's home video release, would be published as a standalone volume. The series was licensed by Yen Press in June 2014 and the volumes were released from January 20, 2015, to July 24, 2018.

A prequel titled , written by Takahiro and illustrated by Kei Toru, was serialized in Monthly Big Gangan from October 25, 2013, to January 25, 2019. The story focuses on Akame's past during the days she worked as an assassin for the Empire. Its chapters were collected in ten tankōbon volumes, released from June 21, 2014, to April 25, 2019. It was licensed by Yen Press in September 2015 and the volumes were released from March 22, 2016, to October 29, 2019.

Takahiro published a sequel manga, titled , with art by strelka in Monthly Big Gangan from June 24, 2017, to June 24, 2022. Its chapters were collected in eight tankōbon volumes, released from December 25, 2017, to August 25, 2022. Yen Press has licensed the manga, and released the chapters simultaneously as they were released in Japan.

Anime

An anime television series adaptation of the manga was announced in January 2014. The teaser site of the series was opened on January 21, 2014. The series was directed by Tomoki Kobayashi and written by Makoto Uezu. Takahiro also supervised the scenario. Taku Iwasaki composed the series' music. The series premiered on the Tokyo MX, MBS and BS11 television stations on July 7, 2014.

The anime was licensed by Sentai Filmworks in 2014. Akame ga Kill! was broadcast in the United States on Adult Swim's Toonami programming block from August 9, 2015, to February 21, 2016. The series' premiere was one of the most watched programs in the block's history, with over 1.8 million viewers. Medialink licensed the series in Asia-Pacific and streamed on Ani-One Asia YouTube channel.

Reception
The seventh volume sold 24,181 copies within the first week of release. The eighth volume likewise sold 37,833 copies in its debut week. Up until volume 11, the series has sold over 2.1 million copies. The English release debuted at 19th in Monthly BookScan during February 2015.

All five volumes of the English translation have appeared on The New York Times Manga Best Sellers list:
 Volume one stayed on the list for twelve nonconsecutive weeks; for three of those weeks it ranked first.
 Volume two stayed on the list for four weeks; for one of those weeks it ranked first.
 Volume three stayed on the list for four weeks; for one of those weeks it ranked second.
 Volume four stayed on the list for two weeks; for one of those weeks it ranked second.
 Volume five stayed on the list for two weeks; for one of those weeks it ranked first.
 Volume six stayed on the list for one week, ranking at first place.
 Volume seven stayed on the list for one week, ranking at fourth place.

The first volume of Akame ga Kill! Zero also appeared on the list for three weeks, ranking at 6th place for one week.

Both the main and prequel manga combined has 3.3 million copies in print as of August 2016.

Kestrel Swift from The Fandom Post praised the anime's first episode for "harsh, brutal commentary on corruption and how likely it is that the more perfect someone seems, the darker the secret lurking within" as well as its production value by White Fox. Robert Mullarkey from UK Anime Network also gave the series a similar response for its action scenes and violence displayed. However, he criticized some of its characters and claimed the anime needs to "ditch the comedy". While reviewing the series' first eight episodes, Matt Packard from Anime News Network said that "it's stupid and childish" as "[t]here's nothing mature about the idea that evil always takes the form of a psychopath or a power-hungry glutton, or that people become soul-dead assassins because something traumatic happened to them once, or that the physically weak are destined to become slaves and die weeping". In the Goo ranking website, Akame ga Kill! ranked 36th with 9 votes in the list of Anime's Most Miserable Endings.

Notes

References

External links
 at Square Enix 
 at Square Enix 
 
 at Square Enix 

Anime series based on manga
C-Station
Dark fantasy anime and manga
Discrimination in fiction
Domestic violence in fiction
Fiction about assassinations
Gangan Comics manga
Manga adapted into television series
Mass murder in fiction
Medialink
Racism in fiction
Fiction about rebellions
Anime and manga about revenge
Seinen manga
Sentai Filmworks
Shōnen manga
Square Enix franchises
Television shows written by Makoto Uezu
Toonami
War in anime and manga
White Fox
Works about abuse
Works about assassinations
Works about corruption
Works about rape
Works about torture
Yen Press titles